Ashith Surya (born December 22, 1995) is an Indian badminton player, who plays in singles, doubles and mixed doubles categories.

Achievements

BWF International 
Men's doubles

References

External links 

Living people
Indian male badminton players
1995 births